John Travolta (born 1954) is an American actor and singer

Travolta may also refer to:

 Ellen Travolta (born 1940), American actress and sister of John
 Joey Travolta (born 1950), American actor, filmmaker, and brother of John
 Margaret Travolta, American actress and sister of John
 "Travolta" (song), by American experimental band Mr. Bungle
 The Travoltas, a band from the Netherlands